

Georg Koßmala (22 October 1896 – 18 March 1945) was a general in the Wehrmacht of Nazi Germany during World War II. He was a recipient of the Knight's Cross of the Iron Cross with Oak Leaves. Koßmala was killed on 18 March 1945 in Oberglogau in Upper Silesia.

Awards and decorations

 Clasp to the Iron Cross (1939) 2nd Class (6 October 1939) & 1st Class (22 August 1941)
 Knight's Cross of the Iron Cross with Oak Leaves
 Knight's Cross on 13 March 1942 as Oberst and commander of Sicherungs-Regiment 3
 Oak Leaves on 26 March 1944 as Oberst and commander of Grenadier-Regiment 6

References

Citations

Bibliography

 
 

1896 births
1945 deaths
People from Mysłowice
People from the Province of Silesia
Major generals of the German Army (Wehrmacht)
German Army personnel of World War I
German police officers
German Army personnel killed in World War II
Recipients of the clasp to the Iron Cross, 1st class
Recipients of the Knight's Cross of the Iron Cross with Oak Leaves
German Army generals of World War II